David Kronick may refer to:

 David A. Kronick (1917–2006), American librarian
 David C. Kronick (born 1932), American politician in New Jersey